Stig Josefson  (May 6, 1921 - December 14, 1996) was a Swedish politician. He was a member of the Centre Party.

References

Centre Party (Sweden) politicians
1921 births
1996 deaths
20th-century Swedish politicians